Countdown to Extinction: Live is a live album by American heavy metal band Megadeth, released on September 24, 2013, through Dave Mustaine's Tradecraft label in Blu-ray, DVD, and CD formats. It was recorded during the band's "Countdown to Extinction 20th Anniversary Tour" at a show at Fox Theatre in Pomona, California, on December 7, 2012, and features the band performing the entire Countdown to Extinction album. The album debuted at number 119 on the Billboard 200.

Background and release

Countdown to Extinction was released in 1992, and became the band's most successful record both on the charts (U.S. #2) and in sales numbers (2× platinum). The "20th anniversary tour" idea for this album follows on a similar tour in honor of the 20th anniversary of another Megadeth album, Rust in Peace (1990) and its associated live album.

Reception

Critical reaction
Fred Thomas of AllMusic commented that while the execution of the album was "surprisingly interesting", the production and feel of the original album were not present.

Commercial performance
Countdown to Extinction: Live sold about 3600 copies in the U.S. during its first week, enough to reach number 119 on the Billboard 200.

Track listing
All tracks from Countdown to Extinction unless otherwise noted; all music and lyrics by Mustaine unless otherwise noted

Charts

Albums charts

Video charts

Personnel
Megadeth
Dave Mustaine – guitars, lead vocals
Chris Broderick – guitars, backing vocals
David Ellefson – bass, backing vocals
Shawn Drover – drums, percussion

References

Megadeth live albums
2013 live albums
2013 video albums
Live video albums